Marina Elliott is a Canadian biological anthropologist, who is known for being one of the six Underground Astronauts of the Rising Star Expedition.

Eliott has a Master's degree and PhD in biological anthropology from Simon Fraser University in British Columbia, Canada. Elliott has participated in excavations at Lake Baikal in southern Siberia, and at the northernmost archaeological site in the USA: Nuvuk on Point Barrow, Alaska.

While working on her PhD in 2013, Eliott was chosen to be part of a small team of scientists to excavate the Rising Star Cave near Johannesburg, South Africa. Her background in archaeology, caving experience and the ability to squeeze through narrow spaces made Elliott an ideal match for the select team.

She is currently a researcher at the Evolutionary Studies Institute, University of the Witwatersrand, Johannesburg, working on excavations at and around the Rising Star Cave. Elliott's research focuses on the archaeology and anatomy of the human skeleton,  forensic anthropology and the archaeology of death and burial.

Awards 
In 2016, Elliott was awarded the National Geographic Society Emerging Explorer Award. "The program recognizes and supports uniquely gifted and inspiring scientists, conservationists, storytellers and innovators who are making a difference early in their careers."

Selected publications

See also 
 Dawn of Humanity

References 

Simon Fraser University alumni
Canadian women anthropologists
Year of birth missing (living people)
Living people